Ahmed Al-Imam (born 1 January 1982) is a Qatari sprinter. He competed in the men's 4 × 400 metres relay at the 2000 Summer Olympics.

References

1982 births
Living people
Athletes (track and field) at the 2000 Summer Olympics
Qatari male sprinters
Olympic athletes of Qatar
Place of birth missing (living people)